Toria Nichole Penn (born July 11, 1988) is a Bahamian model and beauty pageant titleholder who was crowned Miss Universe Bahamas 2015 and represented her country at the Miss Universe 2015 pageant.

On September 13, 2015, Penn was crowned Miss Universe Bahamas 2015 at the Atlantis Box Office as the representative from Paradise Island. She competed against four other representatives from across the Bahamas. As Miss Bahamas, Penn competed at the Miss Universe 2015 pageant, but did not place.

References

External links
Official Miss Bahamas website

Miss Universe 2015 contestants
Bahamian beauty pageant winners
1988 births
Living people